"The Popcorn" is a 1969 instrumental written and recorded by James Brown. It was the first of several records Brown made inspired by the popular dance of the same name. Released as a single on King Records, it charted #11 R&B and #30 Pop. It also appeared as the title track of an album released the same year.

Background
The recording's bassline shares great similarities with Cold Sweat. In fact, it's a revamp of an earlier single "Bringing Up the Guitar" by Alfred Ellis and The Dapps, featuring the same band on this recording.

Chart performance

"The Chicken"
The single's B-side, "The Chicken", written by Brown's saxophonist and bandleader Alfred Ellis, was prominently covered by jazz bassist Jaco Pastorius on his live albums Invitation and   The Birthday Concert.

External links
 "Popcorn Unlimited", an article by Douglas Wolk about James Brown's "Popcorn" records

References

James Brown songs
Songs written by James Brown
1969 singles
1960s instrumentals
1969 songs
King Records (United States) singles